Kenneth Lin (born 1978) is an American playwright and screenwriter. Lin's plays have been performed throughout the world and his TV shows have been distributed via Netflix, HBO, Cinemax, Hulu and more. In theatre, he is best known for his plays Po Boy Tango, Farewell My Concubine (coming soon), and Kleptocracy (just released). In Television, he is best known for his work on the Netflix series House of Cards, the Hulu Series, The First, and the Cinemax series, The Warrior. He is a member of the theater/music/film collective New Neighborhood.

Upcoming theatrical works include Farewell My Concubine with composer Jason Robert Brown (Cinematic Productions), Life On Paper (Jackalope Theatre Company) and The Adventures of Huckleberry Finn with music by Stew and the Negro Problem. Television credits include The First (Hulu), House of Cards (Netflix, Emmy nomination, Best Dramatic Series), Warrior (HBO/Cinemax), and Sweetbitter (Starz). Feature film credits include Abacus (dir. Justin Lin). Awards/honors include winner of the Kendeda Graduate Playwriting Competition, Princess Grace Award, L. Arnold Weissberger Award, Cole Porter Prize, Edgerton New Play Prize and Fulbright Scholarship. Education: Yale School of Drama

Early life and education 
Lin was born in the Bronx, New York to parents of Chinese descent and grew up on Long Island, New York.

Lin was born into a Chinese-American family. Lin attended Cornell University and the Yale School of Drama.  He is an alumnus of the Fulbright Program and was selected as one of the  Dramatists Guild's top “50 to Watch.” In 2013, Lin joined the writing staff for the second and third seasons of the Netflix series House of Cards.

Personal life
Kenneth Lin and Rebecca Ruth Sawyer married  in Riverhead, N.Y. She graduated from the University of Connecticut. She has two master’s degrees, one in East Asian studies from Yale and another in social work from New York University.

Career

Film And Television Work

Warrior (TV Series) 2019 
 (written by - 2 episodes)

Sweetbitter (TV Series) (2018) 
 (consulting producer - 6 episodes)
 (written for television by - 1 episode)

House of Cards (TV Series) (2014-2017) 
 (co-producer - 13 episodes, 2016) (supervising producer - 1 episode, 2017)
 (staff writer - 6 episodes, 2014) (written by - 5 episodes, 2014 - 2017)
 (story editor - 13 episodes-2015)

Stronger (Short) (2016) 
 (executive producer)

My America (2014) 
 (written by - segment "'John'") (2014)

Theatre Work

said Saïd (2007) 
The play received the L. Arnold Weissberger Award, presented annually by The Williamstown Theatre Festival (WTF), on behalf of the Anna L. Weissberger Foundation. Lin received a $10,000 prize and publication of his script by Samuel French, Inc. It also was awarded the Princess Grace Award: Playwriting Fellowship.

The play had its world premiere at the Alliance Theatre and had its West Coast Premiere in 2008.

Po Boy Tango (2007) 
Po Boy Tango, South Coast Repertory Pacific Playwrights Festival, world-premiere Northlight Theatre Company

Intelligence-Slave (2010) 
World-premiere, Alley Theatre

Fallow 
World-premiere, People's Light and Theatre Company

Warrior Class (2012) 
World-premiere (Off Broadway), Second Stage Theater

Pancakes, Pancakes! (2016) 
Ran at the Alliance Theatre Atlanta GA  between May 31 - July 10, 2016.

Adventures of Huckleberry Finn (2017) 
Premiered at Alley Theatre Houston in February 2017

Kleptocracy (2019) 
Performed 2019 Arena Stage, Washington DC

Future projects 
 Life on Paper  (2020): To be performed in 2020 at Jackelope Theatre Company Chicago IL
 Genius in Love 
 About Me 
 Agency 
 Farewell My Concubine

Awards and honours
Kendeda Graduate Playwriting Competition  (said Saïd)

Princess Grace Award  (said Saïd)

L. Arnold Weissberger Award

Cole Porter Prize  (said Saïd)

Edgerton New Play Prize (Po Boy Tango)

Fulbright Scholarship

See also
Kleptocracy
Russia under Vladimir Putin

References

External links

American dramatists and playwrights
Living people
1978 births
Yale School of Drama alumni
Cornell University alumni
Princess Grace Awards winners
Writers from the Bronx
People from Long Island
American television writers
American male television writers
American writers of Chinese descent
American male dramatists and playwrights
Screenwriters from New York (state)
Fulbright alumni